Rebecca Ann Heineman is an American video game designer and programmer. Heineman was a founding member of video game companies Interplay Productions, Logicware, Contraband Entertainment, and Olde Sküül. She has been chief executive officer for Olde Sküül since 2013.

Early life 
Rebecca Ann Heineman (born William Salvador Heineman) was born and raised in Whittier, California. When she was young, she could not afford to purchase games for her Atari 2600, so she taught herself how to copy cartridges and built herself a sizable pirated video game collection. Eventually, she became discontented with just copying games and reverse-engineered the console's code to understand how the games were made. In 1980, Heineman and a friend traveled to Los Angeles to compete in a regional branch of a national Space Invaders championship. Although she did not expect to fall under the top 100 contestants, she won the competition. Later that year, she also won the championship in New York. Heineman is hence considered to be the first national video game tournament champion.

Career 
After she won the tournament, Heineman was offered a writing job for monthly magazine Electronic Games and a consultancy job for a book called How to Master Video Games. During this time, she mentioned to one magazine publisher that she had reverse-engineered Atari 2600 code, and the publisher arranged a meeting between Heineman and the owners of game publisher Avalon Hill. As she met with them, she was hired as a programmer instantaneously. Heineman, aged 16 at the time, moved across the U.S. for her new job, canceling her plans to acquire a high school diploma. At Avalon Hill, Heineman created a manual for the company's programming team, the studio's game engine, and the base code for several software projects, including her own first game, London Blitz, before leaving the company.

Heineman returned to California to work for another developer, Boone Corporation. For Boone, she programmed the games Chuck Norris Superkicks and Robin Hood, acquiring knowledge of programming for Commodore 64, Apple II, VIC-20 and IBM PCs, of video game hardware, as well as video game design. Boone ceased operations in 1983, so Heineman got together with Brian Fargo, Jay Patel and Troy Worrell, and the four founded Interplay Productions (later known as Interplay Entertainment). Heineman acted as lead programmer for the company, working on Wasteland, The Bard's Tale, Out of This World, and the Mac OS and 3DO ports of Wolfenstein 3D.

Heineman went on to design The Bard's Tale III: Thief of Fate, Dragon Wars, Tass Times in Tonetown, Borrowed Time, Mindshadow and The Tracer Sanction, among others, for Interplay. As the company grew to more than 500 employees, Heineman, wishing to return to her small-team roots, left the company in 1995 and co-founded Logicware, where she acted as chief technology officer and lead programmer. Aside from original games, Heineman oversaw the company's porting activities, which included Out of This World, Shattered Steel, Jazz Jackrabbit 2 and a canceled Mac OS port of Half-Life.

In 1999, Heineman founded Contraband Entertainment, operating as its chief executive officer. The company developed several original games alongside ports to various platforms for other developers. Projects led by Heineman include Myth III: The Wolf Age and Activision Anthology, and Mac OS ports for Aliens vs. Predator, Baldur's Gate II and  Heroes of Might and Magic IV. During this time, she also provided consultancy work directly for other companies: She acted as "Senior Engineer III" for Electronic Arts, upgraded engine code for Barking Lizards Technologies and Ubisoft, optimized code for Sensory Sweep Studios, acted as senior software architect for Bloomberg L.P. and Amazon, provided training on Xbox 360 development for Microsoft's development studios, and worked on the kernel code for the PlayStation Portable and PlayStation 4 at Sony. During her tenure at Amazon, Heineman was, in addition to her technological role, also the "Transgender Chair" of Amazon's LGBTQ+ group, known as Glamazon.

Contraband was wound down in 2013, and Heineman founded a new company, Olde Sküül, together with Jennell Jaquays, Maurine Starkey, and Susan Manley. At Olde Sküül, Heineman acts as CEO.

Personal life 
Around 2003, Heineman was diagnosed with gender dysphoria and began transitioning to live as a woman. She formally changed her given name to Rebecca Ann. Since the transition, Heineman has been living as a lesbian. She has five children and is married to Jennell Jaquays. Heineman resides in El Cerrito, California, where her company Olde Sküül is located.

Board service 
Heineman has been part of the advisory board of the Video Game History Museum since 2011, and is part of the board of directors of LGBTQ+ organization GLAAD.

Accolades 
Heineman is recognized as the first national video game tournament champion for winning the 1980 National Space Invaders Championship. Sailor Ranko, a Sailor Moon-based fanfiction comic by Heineman based on an earlier work written by Duncan Zillman, has won multiple awards. She also tried to qualify for the Fortnite World Cup. In 2017, she became an inductee for the International Video Game Hall of Fame.

Games 

 The Bard's Tale (1985)
 Borrowed Time (1985)
 Racing Destruction Set (1986, Atari 8-bit family port)
 Tass Times in Tonetown (1986)
 The Bard's Tale III: Thief of Fate (1988)
 Neuromancer (1988)
 Crystal Quest (1989, Apple IIgs port)
 Dragon Wars (1989)
 Track Meet (1991)
 RPM Racing (1991)
 Another World (1992, SNES port)
 Rescue Rover (1993, Apple IIgs port)
 Interplay's 10 Year Anthology: Classic Collection (1993)
 Ultima I: The First Age of Darkness (1994, Apple IIgs port)
 Wolfenstein 3D (1995, Mac/3DO ports)
 Kingdom: The Far Reaches (1995)
 Killing Time (1996)
 Doom (1996, 3DO port)
 Defiance (1997)
 Tempest 2000 (1998, Mac port)
 Remington Top Shot: Interactive Target Shooting (1998)
 Redneck Rampage (1999, Mac port)
 Jazz Jackrabbit 2 (1999, Mac port)
 Galactic Patrol (1999, Mac port)
 Bugdom (1999)
 Myth III: The Wolf Age (2001)
 Baldur's Gate II: Shadows of Amn (2001, Mac port)
 Nanosaur Extreme (2002)
 Icewind Dale (2002, Mac port)
 Hexen II (2002, Mac port)
 Activision Anthology (2002)
 Medal of Honor: Rising Sun (2003)
 Pitfall: The Lost Expedition (2004)
 Medal of Honor: Pacific Assault (2004)
 GoldenEye: Rogue Agent (2004)
 Medal of Honor: European Assault (2005)
 Command & Conquer 3: Tiberium Wars (2007)
 Alvin and the Chipmunks (2007)
 Chip's Challenge (2015, Windows re-release)

See also 

 List of programmers
 List of women in the video game industry
 Women and video games
 Women in computing

References

External links 
 
 

Computer programmers
Interplay Entertainment people
LGBT people from California
Living people
Microsoft people
People from Whittier, California
Transgender women
Video game programmers
Women video game programmers
Year of birth missing (living people)